Capitán Carmelo Peralta is a district in the department of Alto Paraguay, Paraguay.

References 

Populated places in the Alto Paraguay Department